The Oklahoma Odd Fellows Home at Checotah is a historical building complex in Checotah, Oklahoma, central United States, now on .  It includes Romanesque Revival and Bungalow/Craftsman architecture.  Also known as Odd Fellows Widows and Orphans Home and as Checotah Odd Fellows Home, it served historically as institutional housing and as educational related housing.

It was listed on the National Register of Historic Places in 2001.  The listing includes one contributing building and two other contributing structures.

It was designed originally by architect Joseph P. Foucart, who may also have designed the compatible c. 1905 expansion. M.T. Hardin designed the Bungalow/Craftsman addition in 1922.

The Carmen IOOF Home, in Carmen, is another NRHP-listed Odd Fellows retirement home in the state.

References

Residential buildings on the National Register of Historic Places in Oklahoma
Cultural infrastructure completed in 1902
Buildings and structures in McIntosh County, Oklahoma
Odd Fellows buildings in Oklahoma
American Craftsman architecture in Oklahoma
Bungalow architecture in Oklahoma
National Register of Historic Places in McIntosh County, Oklahoma